"A Symbolic Analysis of Relay and Switching Circuits" is the title of a master's thesis written by computer science pioneer Claude E. Shannon while attending the Massachusetts Institute of Technology (MIT) in 1937.  In his thesis, Shannon, a dual degree graduate of the University of Michigan, proved that Boolean algebra could be used to simplify the arrangement of the relays that were the building blocks of the electromechanical automatic telephone exchanges of the day.  Shannon went on to prove that it should also be possible to use arrangements of relays to solve Boolean algebra problems.

The utilization of the binary properties of electrical switches to perform logic functions is the basic concept that underlies all electronic digital computer designs.  Shannon's thesis became the foundation of practical digital circuit design when it became widely known among the electrical engineering community during and after World War II.  At the time, the methods employed to design logic circuits were ad hoc in nature and lacked the theoretical discipline that Shannon's paper supplied to later projects.

Psychologist Howard Gardner described Shannon's thesis as "possibly the most important, and also the most famous, master's thesis of the century".  A version of the paper was published in the 1938 issue of the Transactions of the American Institute of Electrical Engineers, and in 1940, it earned Shannon the Alfred Noble American Institute of American Engineers Award.

References

External links
Full text at MIT

Computer science papers
Information theory
Applied mathematics
1937 in science
1937 documents
Claude Shannon